Heo Young-ji (born August 30, 1994), better known mononymously as Youngji, is a South Korean singer, dancer, entertainer and television personality. She is best known as a member of girl group Kara after winning the TV show Kara Project in 2014, which saw her become the newest member of the group. Heo began her solo music career in August 2017 with her first single, "Memory Clock".

Career

Pre-debut 
Heo attended School of Performing Arts Seoul. She was a former trainee at Core Contents Media alongside T-ara's ex-member Areum. She was about to debut in a new girl group but left before the girl group debuted. Later, she became a trainee at KeyEast before becoming a trainee at DSP Media.

2014–2015: Debut with Kara and solo activities
In May 2014, after former Kara members Nicole Jung and Kang Ji-young left the group, DSP Media launched a reality TV show called Kara Project which revolved around seven trainees competing to become the new member of the group. Even though she missed 2 live performances due to a leg injury from practice, she grabbed attention from viewers and topped the voting charts.

On July 1, the live voting results commenced on 6:45 pm (KST). Hur Young-ji was proclaimed the winner with a total score of 49,591. After winning the show, she gave a winning speech saying she'll work even harder as a new member of Kara.

In September 2014, Heo was one of the new participants for the second season of the show, Roommate. She was known for her muted laughter, and on the Christmas special of Roommate, it was shown that Heo's family members have similar laughing styles as well. In the interview as a preview for being one of the new cast members for Roommate, she said that many people told her to cover her mouth while laughing, but it was very problematic and now she is more comfortable to laugh without covering her mouth.

When fellow member Goo Hara guested on Episode 9 of Roommate, she shared that she wanted Heo to be chosen as a member of Kara as she has charms that the existing members does not have and Kara feel more youthful with her.

An MBC EVERY1 representative told MBN Star on December 18, 2014 that Heo would join Hitmaker season 2 as a part of a girl group, along with Orange Caramel's Lizzy, G.NA, 4minute's So-hyun. The group was later named Cham So Nyeo. The group first released their debut song teaser "올해의 주문 (Magic Words)" on February 17, followed by the full song and music video 3 days later, on February 20.

2016–present: Acting career and solo work
On January 15, 2016, DSP Media announced Gyuri, Seungyeon and Hara's departure from the group due to contracts expiring. The company also noted that Heo would continue her music career as a solo artist.

On April 13, Park Gyu-ri stated that the group did not disband and that the members hoped to release new albums in the future.

In May 2016, she was cast in a supporting role in the tvN drama, Another Oh Hae Young. She was also cast in several television programs, such as MBC's Very Private TV as a cast member, m SBS' War of Vocals - God's Voice as a panelist and EBS' Humanity Busking as a host.

On December 8, 2016, DSP Media revealed Heo as the first hidden member of their new co-ed group K.A.R.D. She promoted with the group for their first project single "OH NA NA", which was released on December 13.

On August 2, 2017, DSP Media confirmed that Heo was preparing for her solo debut in August. Her first single titled Memory Clock was released on August 25.

On December 15, 2017, MCC Entertainment released news article that revealed she will participate on 2nd song of project 'with dog'. The song titled Longing was released on the same day.

In August 2021, Heo renewed her contract with DSP Media.

Discography

Singles

Collaborations

Filmography

Film

Television series

Television shows

Web shows

Production credits

Awards and nominations

References

External links

Hur Young-ji on Facebook

1994 births
Living people
People from Goyang
Japanese-language singers of South Korea
Kara (South Korean group) members
South Korean female idols
South Korean dance musicians
South Korean women pop singers
K-pop singers
South Korean rhythm and blues singers
South Korean television actresses
South Korean sopranos
South Korean television personalities
School of Performing Arts Seoul alumni
21st-century South Korean singers
DSP Media artists
21st-century South Korean women singers